The UK Women's Athletics League is a track and field athletics competition for teams of women. It is the women's equivalent of the men's British Athletics League and is the pinnacle of British athletic clubs league system.

The UK Women's Athletics League was inaugurated in 1975.

In 2015 it consisted of four divisions, with up to 32 teams from across the United Kingdom.

Competition

There are four different divisions (Premier, Division 1, Division 2 and Division 3). Each of them has eight teams in competition, except the Division 3, with only seven teams. Every season there is a total of three matches to decide the division standings, two teams are relegated and two teams promoted for every division.
In September each year a qualifying match shall be held and the leading two clubs in that match shall compete in Division 3 the following season. The qualifying match shall involve the highest placed club which wishes to compete, from each of the regional Scottish, Northern, Midland, Southern and Welsh leagues.

Winning teams

This table lists the top placed clubs from the top division:

Teams in 2019

Premier

Division 1

Division 2

Division 3

References

External links
UK Women's Athletic League

Athletics competitions in England
Annual track and field meetings
Track and field in the United Kingdom
Women's athletics competitions
Track and field organizations